Vavilovo is a rural locality (a selo) in Khazarsky Selsoviet, Derbentsky District, Republic of Dagestan, Russia. The population was 236 as of 2010. There are 4 streets.

Geography 
Vavilovo is located 10 km south of Derbent (the district's administrative centre) by road. Nizhny Dzhiglan and Khazar are the nearest rural localities.

Nationalities 
Tabasarans, Lezgins and Azerbaijanis live there.

References 

Rural localities in Derbentsky District